The German-based varieties spoken by German Brazilians together form a significant minority language in Brazil. "Brazilian German" is strongly influenced by Portuguese and to a lesser extent by Italian dialects as well as indigenous languages. German dialects and Germanic languages are particularly strong in Brazil's South and Southeast Regions. According to Ethnologue, ca. 3 million people in Brazil speak the Hunsrik Language, 1.5 million speak Standard German.

German speakers from Germany, Switzerland and Austria make up the largest group of immigrants after Portuguese and Italian speakers. They tended to preserve their language longer than the speakers of Italian, which is closer to Portuguese. Consequently, German was the second most common family language in Brazil at the 1940 census. However, even in areas that are still dominated by German speakers, most are bilingual. Today, German is increasingly cultivated as a cultural heritage, and several municipalities have recently given co-official status with Portuguese to one Brazilian variant or another of it.

The language Hunsrik or Riograndenser Hunsrückisch is the most significant variant. It is particularly well represented in the two southernmost states, Rio Grande do Sul and Santa Catarina. But especially in Espírito Santo there are significant pockets whose dialect is based on East Low German (East Pomeranian),  and some other dialects can be found locally due to 20th century immigration.

Hunsrik

Hunsrik, a language derived from the Hunsrückisch dialect, is also referred to as Riograndenser Hunsrückisch (or Brazilian Hunsrückisch) after the country's southernmost state, Rio Grande do Sul. It is also strongly represented in Santa Catarina, where the local variant is referred to as Katharinensisch, and in Paraná. Together, these three states form Brazil's South Region. The area attracted significant immigration from German-speaking countries.

German immigration to Rio Grande do Sul started in 1824. The German workers and settlers came from many different regions, but especially from the poor regions Hunsrück and nearby Palatinate. The German dialects began to mix with each other, adopting elements of the languages spoken by other immigrants, to form varieties that differed from municipality to municipality, often from family to family, and which had no relation to the dialect lines in Germany. However, in most places the Hunsrück dialect proved dominant.

Initially, the immigrants had to organize their own school system, but this was to change.
Due to lack of exposure – from 1938 till 1961, German was not even taught at higher schools. – Standard German became restricted to formal contexts such as church, whereas all daily interactions happened either in dialect or in Portuguese, from which the required words for innovations were also taken.

Speakers of Hunsrik are typically bilingual with Portuguese, but are not necessarily familiar with Standard German. The elementary school of Santa Maria do Herval, a municipality in Rio Grande do Sul with a population of roughly 6,000, teaches Hunsrik and uses a new orthography for this which is closer to Portuguese than to Standard German conventions, this follows a research by SIL International and led by professor Ursula Wiesemann to standardize the language according to its actual use in the local communities and social networks. This method is also used for teaching on other local municipalities with native Hunsrik speakers. A concurrent standardization approach led by the professor Cléo Altenhofen criticizes this detachment, demanding a closer orthographic tie between Hunsrik and Standard German, and arguing that the efforts should try to revert the Portuguese influence over the language by keeping a very conservative orthography, in a way that it would be only a variation of the original Hunsrückisch dialect.

In July 2018, the mayor of Blumenau, Mario Hildebrandt, signed Decree no. 11,850/2018, which created the Bilingual Erich Klabunde Municipal School, offering teaching in Portuguese and German.

Co-official status
Santa Catarina
Antônio Carlos
Ipumirim
Treze Tílias
Rio Grande do Sul
Santa Maria do Herval
Barão

East Pomeranian

East Pomeranian, a dialect of Low German, is spoken in many places in southeastern and southern Brazil:

 Projeto de Educação Escolar Pomerana, founded 2004 by teachers and five municipalities in Espírito Santo (Santa Maria de Jetibá, Laranja da Terra, Vila Pavão, Domingos Martins, Pancas). Education in (Brazilian?) East Pomeranian. 
 Spoken in Rondônia since 1970.
 In Santa Leopoldina, first European settlement in Espírito Santo, the descendants of immigrants from Switzerland and Luxembourg now speak East Pomeranian.
 Santa Maria de Jetibá (previously part of Santa Leopoldina) is Brazil's center of Pommeranian culture with 90% (ethnic?) Pommeranians.

Co-official status
Espírito Santo
Afonso Cláudio (in the district of Mata Fria)
Domingos Martins
Itarana
Laranja da Terra
Pancas
Santa Maria de Jetibá
Vila Pavão
Santa Catarina
Pomerode
Rio Grande do Sul
Canguçu
Rondônia
Espigão d'Oeste
Minas Gerais
Itueta (only in the district of Vila Nietzel)

Other German dialects in Brazil
 Plautdietsch, spoken by Mennonites from the former Soviet Union (since the 1930s).
 Tyrol Austro-Bavarian dialect and Vorarlberg Alemannic in Treze Tílias (since 1933).
 Danube Swabian in Guarapuava (since 1951).
 Paraná-Wolga-Deutsch
 Vestfaliano

Plattdüütsch or Vestfaliano
Plattdüütsch, or Vestfaliano is a variation of the Westphalian language or Westfalisch, one of the major dialect groups of West Low German. This spoken dialect has legal and co-official status in the municipality of Westfália, according to the lei N° 1302 of 2016
This dialect variety was brought by immigrants coming from Westphalia establishing communities and language island in Rio Grande do Sul and Santa Catarina.

See also
 List of territorial entities where German is an official language
 Geographical distribution of German speakers
 Languages of Brazil
 German Brazilians

References

Austrian Brazilian
Languages of Brazil
German-Brazilian culture
German dialects
Swiss Brazilian